Khaled Holmes (born January 19, 1990) is a former American football center. He played college football at USC, and was drafted by the Indianapolis Colts in the fourth round of the 2013 NFL Draft.

Early years
Holmes was born in San Diego, California.  As a senior offensive lineman at Mater Dei High School in Santa Ana, he was named a Prep Star All American. Trojan teammates Matt Barkley, Victor Blackwell and Max Wittek also prepped at Mater Dei in 2007.

College career

Holmes enrolled in the University of Southern California, where he played for the USC Trojans football team from 2009 to 2012.  He started all of 2010 at right offensive guard as a sophomore and was named a 2010 All-Pac-10 honorable mention.  Holmes started for his second season on the offensive lineman as a junior in 2011, performing exceptionally well at center in 2011 after playing offensive guard in 2010. He made the 2011 All-Pac-12 second-team and the Phil Steele All-Pac-12 second-team. He was moved from guard to center in 2011 spring practice. Holmes received his bachelor's degree in Classics at USC in the spring of 2011 and completed a master's degree in Communication Management the following year, 2012. He made the 2011 Pac-12 All-Academic second-team. He made 2010 Pac-10 All-Academic honorable mention. Holmes started his third season as a senior in 2012 as an Academic All-American candidate and after the regular season was named one of six finalists for the Rimington Trophy, given annually to college football's top center.

Professional career
Holmes was considered one of the top interior line prospects in the 2013 NFL Draft.

Indianapolis Colts
On April 27, Holmes was taken in the fourth round, with the 121st overall pick, of the 2013 NFL Draft by the Indianapolis Colts. He made his NFL debut in Week 15 against the Houston Texans. On May 2, 2016, Holmes was waived by the Colts.

Chicago Bears
The Chicago Bears signed Holmes on August 14, 2016. On September 3, 2016, he was released by the Bears as part of final roster cuts.

New York Giants
On January 18, 2017, Holmes signed a reserve/future contract with the Giants. He was released by the Giants on June 8, 2017.

References

External links
Indianapolis Colts bio
USC Trojans bio

1990 births
Living people
Sportspeople from Santa Ana, California
Players of American football from California
American football centers
American football offensive guards
USC Trojans football players
All-American college football players
Indianapolis Colts players
Chicago Bears players
New York Giants players